Rakesh Pathania is an Indian politician and a member of Nurpur (Vidhan Sabha constituency) in Himachal Pradesh for third time. In 2021 Cabinet reshuffle he was sworn in as Cabinet Minister for Forest, Sports and Youth Affairs Bharatiya Janata Party Himachal Pradesh Legislative Assembly.

References 

Year of birth missing (living people)
Living people
Bharatiya Janata Party politicians from Himachal Pradesh
Himachal Pradesh MLAs 1998–2003
Himachal Pradesh MLAs 2007–2012
Himachal Pradesh MLAs 2017–2022